A beneficiary (also, in trust law, cestui que use) in the broadest sense is a natural person or other legal entity who receives money or other benefits from a benefactor. For example, the beneficiary of a life insurance policy is the person who receives the payment of the amount of insurance after the death of the insured. 

Most beneficiaries may be designed to designate where the assets will go when the owner(s) dies. However, if the primary beneficiary or beneficiaries are not alive or do not qualify under the restrictions, the assets will probably pass to the contingent beneficiaries. Other restrictions such as being married or more creative ones can be used by a benefactor to attempt to control the behavior of the beneficiaries. Some situations such as retirement accounts do not allow any restrictions beyond death of the primary beneficiaries, but trusts allow any restrictions that are not illegal or for an illegal purpose.

The concept of a "beneficiary" will also frequently figure in contracts other than insurance policies. A third-party beneficiary of a contract is a person whom the parties intend to benefit from its provisions but who is not a party to the contract. A software distributor, for example, may seek provisions protecting its customers from infringement claims. A software licensor may include in its agreements provisions that protect those who provided code to that licensor.

In the context of development aid, the term "beneficiaries" refer to the persons and the communities that use the project outputs: the entities that development-aid projects.

See also
Beneficiary (trust)
Estate planning
Inheritance
Birth certificate
Legal fiction

References

Legal terminology
Wills and trusts